Christ CMI Central School was established in 2012. The school is under the management of Christ CMI Educational and Charitable Trust, Anjugramam. The immediate Patron of the school is St. Thomas Bhavan CMI Ashram Anjugramam, Kanyakumari District. Mrs. Daisy Thomas is the Principal, Rev. Fr. Charles Mundakathil CMI is the correspondent. The school offers classes from Pre-Nursery to 10th std. It is located in Anjugramam, Kanyakumari.

See also 
 List of Christian schools in India
 List of Schools in India

References 

Catholic schools in India
Private schools in Tamil Nadu
Christian schools in Tamil Nadu
Schools in Kanyakumari district
Educational institutions established in 2012
2012 establishments in Tamil Nadu